Judith is an oil-on-canvas painting by Simon Vouet, executed c. 1620–1625. It depicts Judith, the leading character of the Book of Judith, holding the severed head of king Holofernes. She is shown finely dressed, holding her sword with her right hand, and showing the head of Holofernes at her left. 

The painting is held at the Alte Pinakothek in Munich.

References

Paintings by Simon Vouet
Vouet
Collection of the Alte Pinakothek
1620s paintings